Environmental law is a collective term encompassing aspects of the law that provide protection to the environment. A related but distinct set of regulatory regimes, now strongly influenced by environmental legal principles, focus on the management of specific natural resources, such as forests, minerals, or fisheries. Other areas, such as environmental impact assessment, may not fit neatly into either category, but are nonetheless important components of environmental law.

History

Early examples of legal enactments designed to consciously preserve the environment, for its own sake or human enjoyment, are found throughout history. In the common law, the primary protection was found in the law of nuisance, but this only allowed for private actions for damages or injunctions if there was harm to land. Thus, smells emanating from pigsties, strict liability against dumping rubbish, or damage from exploding dams. Private enforcement, however, was limited and found to be woefully inadequate to deal with major environmental threats, particularly threats to common resources. During the "Great Stink" of 1858, the dumping of sewerage into the River Thames began to smell so ghastly in the summer heat that Parliament had to be evacuated. Ironically, the Metropolitan Commission of Sewers Act 1848 had allowed the Metropolitan Commission for Sewers to close cesspits around the city in an attempt to "clean up" but this simply led people to pollute the river. In 19 days, Parliament passed a further Act to build the London sewerage system. London also suffered from terrible air pollution, and this culminated in the "Great Smog" of 1952, which in turn triggered its own legislative response: the Clean Air Act 1956. The basic regulatory structure was to set limits on emissions for households and businesses (particularly burning of coal) while an inspectorate would enforce compliance.

Pollution control

Air quality

Water quality

Waste management

Contaminant cleanup

Chemical safety
Chemical safety laws govern the use of chemicals in human activities, particularly man-made chemicals in modern industrial applications. As contrasted with media-oriented environmental laws (e.g., air or water quality laws), chemical control laws seek to manage the (potential) pollutants themselves. Regulatory efforts include banning specific chemical constituents in consumer products (e.g., Bisphenol A in plastic bottles), and regulating pesticides.

Resource sustainability

Impact assessment

Water resources 

Water resources laws govern the ownership and use of water resources, including surface water and ground water. Regulatory areas may include water conservation, use restrictions, and ownership regimes.

Mineral resources

Forest resources

Wildlife and plants 
Wildlife laws govern the potential impact of human activity on wild animals, whether directly on individuals or populations, or indirectly via habitat degradation. Similar laws may operate to protect plant species. Such laws may be enacted entirely to protect biodiversity, or as a means for protecting species deemed important for other reasons. Regulatory efforts may including the creation of special conservation statuses, prohibitions on killing, harming, or disturbing protected species, efforts to induce and support species recovery, establishment of wildlife refuges to support conservation, and prohibitions on trafficking in species or animal parts to combat poaching.

Fish and game 

Fish and game laws regulate the right to pursue and take or kill certain kinds of fish and wild animal (game). Such laws may restrict the days to harvest fish or game, the number of animals caught per person, the species harvested, or the weapons or fishing gear used. Such laws may seek to balance dueling needs for preservation and harvest and to manage both environment and populations of fish and game. Game laws can provide a legal structure to collect license fees and other money which is used to fund conservation efforts as well as to obtain harvest information used in wildlife management practice.

Principles
Environmental law has developed in response to emerging awareness of and concern over issues impacting the entire world. While laws have developed piecemeal and for a variety of reasons, some effort has gone into identifying key concepts and guiding principles common to environmental law as a whole. The principles discussed below are not an exhaustive list and are not universally recognized or accepted. Nonetheless, they represent important principles for the understanding of environmental law around the world.

Sustainable development 

Defined by the United Nations Environment Programme (UNEP) as "development that meets the needs of the present without compromising the ability of future generations to meet their own needs," sustainable development may be considered together with the concepts of "integration" (development cannot be considered in isolation from sustainability) and "interdependence" (social and economic development, and environmental protection, are interdependent).  Laws mandating environmental impact assessment and requiring or encouraging development to minimize environmental impacts may be assessed against this principle.

The modern concept of sustainable development was a topic of discussion at the 1972 United Nations Conference on the Human Environment (Stockholm Conference), and the driving force behind the 1983 World Commission on Environment and Development (WCED, or Bruntland Commission). In 1992, the first UN Earth Summit resulted in the Rio Declaration, Principle 3 of which reads: "The right to development must be fulfilled so as to equitably meet developmental and environmental needs of present and future generations." Sustainable development has been a core concept of international environmental discussion ever since, including at the World Summit on Sustainable Development (Earth Summit 2002), and the United Nations Conference on Sustainable Development (Earth Summit 2012, or Rio+20).

Equity 

Defined by UNEP to include intergenerational equity – "the right of future generations to enjoy a fair level of the common patrimony" – and intragenerational equity – "the right of all people within the current generation to fair access to the current generation's entitlement to the Earth's natural resources" – environmental equity considers the present generation under an obligation to account for long-term impacts of activities, and to act to sustain the global environment and resource base for future generations. Pollution control and resource management laws may be assessed against this principle.

Transboundary responsibility 
Defined in the international law context as an obligation to protect one's own environment, and to prevent damage to neighboring environments, UNEP considers transboundary responsibility at the international level as a potential limitation on the rights of the sovereign state.  Laws that act to limit externalities imposed upon human health and the environment may be assessed against this principle.

Public participation and transparency 
Identified as essential conditions for "accountable governments,...  industrial concerns," and organizations generally, public participation and transparency are presented by UNEP as requiring "effective protection of the human right to hold and express opinions and to seek, receive and impart ideas,... a right of access to appropriate, comprehensible and timely information held by governments and industrial concerns on economic and social policies regarding the sustainable use of natural resources and the protection of the environment, without imposing undue financial burdens upon the applicants and with adequate protection of privacy and business confidentiality," and "effective judicial and administrative proceedings." These principles are present in environmental impact assessment, laws requiring publication and access to relevant environmental data, and administrative procedure.

Precautionary principle 

One of the most commonly encountered and controversial principles of environmental law, the Rio Declaration formulated the precautionary principle as follows:In order to protect the environment, the precautionary approach shall be widely applied by States according to their capabilities. Where there are threats of serious or irreversible damage, lack of full scientific certainty shall not be used as a reason for postponing cost-effective measures to prevent environmental degradation.The principle may play a role in any debate over the need for environmental regulation.

Prevention 
The concept of prevention ... can perhaps better be considered an overarching aim that gives rise to a multitude of legal mechanisms, including prior assessment of environmental harm, licensing or authorization that set out the conditions for operation and the consequences for violation of the conditions, as well as the adoption of strategies and policies. Emission limits and other product or process standards, the use of best available techniques and similar techniques can all be seen as applications of the concept of prevention.

Polluter pays principle 

The polluter pays principle stands for the idea that "the environmental costs of economic activities, including the cost of preventing potential harm, should be internalized rather than imposed upon society at large."  All issues related to responsibility for cost for environmental remediation and compliance with pollution control regulations involve this principle.

Theory
Environmental law is a continuing source of controversy. Debates over the necessity, fairness, and cost of environmental regulation are ongoing, as well as regarding the appropriateness of regulations vs. market solutions to achieve even agreed-upon ends.

Allegations of scientific uncertainty fuel the ongoing debate over greenhouse gas regulation, and are a major factor in debates over whether to ban particular pesticides. In cases where the science is well-settled, it is not unusual to find that corporations intentionally hide or distort the facts, or sow confusion.

It is very common for regulated industry to argue against environmental regulation on the basis of cost. Difficulties arise in performing cost-benefit analysis of environmental issues.  It is difficult to quantify the value of an environmental value such as a healthy ecosystem, clean air, or species diversity. Many environmentalists' response to pitting economy vs. ecology is summed up by former Senator and founder of Earth Day Gaylord Nelson, "The economy is a wholly owned subsidiary of the environment, not the other way around." Furthermore, environmental issues are seen by many as having an ethical or moral dimension, which would transcend financial cost. Even so, there are some efforts underway to systemically recognize environmental costs and assets, and account for them properly in economic terms.

While affected industries spark controversy in fighting regulation, there are also many environmentalists and public interest groups who believe that current regulations are inadequate, and advocate for stronger protection. Environmental law conferences – such as the annual Public Interest Environmental Law Conference in Eugene, Oregon – typically have this focus, also connecting environmental law with class, race, and other issues.

An additional debate is to what extent environmental laws are fair to all regulated parties. For instance, researchers Preston Teeter and Jorgen Sandberg highlight how smaller organizations can often incur disproportionately larger costs as a result of environmental regulations, which can ultimately create an additional barrier to entry for new firms, thus stifling competition and innovation.

International environmental law

Global and regional environmental issues are increasingly the subject of international law. Debates over environmental concerns implicate core principles of international law and have been the subject of numerous international agreements and declarations.

Customary international law is an important source of international environmental law.  These are the norms and rules that countries follow as a matter of custom and they are so prevalent that they bind all states in the world.  When a principle becomes customary law is not clear cut and many arguments are put forward by states not wishing to be bound.  Examples of customary international law relevant to the environment include the duty to warn other states promptly about icons of an environmental nature and environmental damages to which another state or states may be exposed, and Principle 21 of the Stockholm Declaration ('good neighbourliness' or sic utere).

Given that customary international law is not static but ever evolving and the continued increase of air pollution (carbon dioxide) causing climate changes, has led to discussions on whether basic customary principles of international law, such as the jus cogens (peremptory norms) and erga omnes principles could be applicable for enforcing international environmental law.

Numerous legally binding international agreements encompass a wide variety of issue-areas, from terrestrial, marine and atmospheric pollution through to wildlife and biodiversity protection. International environmental agreements are generally multilateral (or sometimes bilateral) treaties (a.k.a. convention, agreement, protocol, etc.). Protocols are subsidiary agreements built from a primary treaty. They exist in many areas of international law but are especially useful in the environmental field, where they may be used to regularly incorporate recent scientific knowledge. They also permit countries to reach an agreement on a framework that would be contentious if every detail were to be agreed upon in advance.  The most widely known protocol in international environmental law is the Kyoto Protocol, which followed from the United Nations Framework Convention on Climate Change.

While the bodies that proposed, argued, agreed upon, and ultimately adopted existing international agreements vary according to each agreement, certain conferences, including 1972's United Nations Conference on the Human Environment, 1983's World Commission on Environment and Development, 1992's United Nations Conference on Environment and Development, and 2002's World Summit on Sustainable Development have been particularly important. Multilateral environmental agreements sometimes create an International Organization, Institution or Body responsible for implementing the agreement. Major examples are the Convention on International Trade in Endangered Species of Wild Fauna and Flora (CITES) and the International Union for Conservation of Nature (IUCN).

International environmental law also includes the opinions of international courts and tribunals. While there are few and they have limited authority, the decisions carry much weight with legal commentators and are quite influential on the development of international environmental law. One of the biggest challenges in international decisions is to determine an adequate compensation for environmental damages. The courts include the International Court of Justice (ICJ), the International Tribunal for the Law of the Sea (ITLOS), the European Court of Justice, European Court of Human Rights and other regional treaty tribunals.

Around the world

Africa 
According to the International Network for Environmental Compliance and Enforcement (INECE), the major environmental issues in Africa are "drought and flooding, air pollution, deforestation, loss of biodiversity, freshwater availability, degradation of soil and vegetation, and widespread poverty."  The U.S. Environmental Protection Agency (EPA) is focused on the "growing urban and industrial pollution, water quality, electronic waste and indoor air from cookstoves." They hope to provide enough aid on concerns regarding pollution before their impacts contaminate the African environment as well as the global environment.  By doing so, they intend to "protect human health, particularly vulnerable populations such as children and the poor."  In order to accomplish these goals in Africa, EPA programs are focused on strengthening the ability to enforce environmental laws as well as public compliance to them.  Other programs work on developing stronger environmental laws, regulations, and standards.

Asia
The Asian Environmental Compliance and Enforcement Network (AECEN) is an agreement between 16 Asian countries dedicated to improving cooperation with environmental laws in Asia. These countries include Cambodia, China, Indonesia, India, Maldives, Japan, Korea, Malaysia, Nepal, Philippines, Pakistan, Singapore, Sri Lanka, Thailand, Vietnam, and Lao PDR.

European Union 
The European Union issues secondary legislation on environmental issues that are valid throughout the EU (so called regulations) and many directives that must be implemented into national legislation from the 27 member states (national states). Examples are the Regulation (EC) No. 338/97 on the implementation of CITES; or the Natura 2000 network the centerpiece for nature & biodiversity policy, encompassing the bird Directive (79/409/EEC/ changed to 2009/147/EC)and the habitats directive (92/43/EEC). Which are made up of multiple SACs (Special Areas of Conservation, linked to the habitats directive) & SPAs (Special Protected Areas, linked to the bird directive), throughout Europe.

EU legislation is ruled in Article 249 Treaty for the Functioning of the European Union (TFEU). Topics for common EU legislation are:

 Climate change
 Air pollution
 Water protection and management
 Waste management
 Soil protection
 Protection of nature, species and biodiversity
 Noise pollution
 Cooperation for the environment with third countries (other than EU member states)
 Civil protection

Middle East 
Environmental law is rapidly growing in the Middle East. The U.S. Environmental Protection Agency is working with countries in the Middle East to improve "environmental governance, water pollution and water security, clean fuels and vehicles, public participation, and pollution prevention."

Oceania
The main concerns about environmental issues in Oceania are "illegal releases of air and water pollutants, illegal logging/timber trade, illegal shipment of hazardous wastes, including e-waste and ships slated for destruction, and insufficient institutional structure/lack of enforcement capacity". The Secretariat of the Pacific Regional Environmental Programme (SPREP)  is an international organization between Australia, the Cook Islands, FMS, Fiji, France, Kiribati, Marshall Islands, Nauru, New Zealand, Niue, Palau, PNG, Samoa, Solomon Island, Tonga, Tuvalu, USA, and Vanuatu. The SPREP was established in order to provide assistance in improving and protecting the environment as well as assure sustainable development for future generations.

Australia 
Commonwealth v Tasmania (1983), also known as the "Tasmanian Dam Case", was a highly significant case in Australian environmental law.

The Environment Protection and Biodiversity Conservation Act 1999 is the centrepiece of environmental legislation in Australia. It sets up the "legal framework to protect and manage nationally and internationally important flora, fauna, ecological communities and heritage places" and focuses on protecting world heritage properties, national heritage properties, wetlands of international importance, nationally threatened species and ecological communities, migratory species, Commonwealth marine areas, Great Barrier Reef Marine Park, and the environment surrounding nuclear activities. However, it has been subject to numerous reviews examining its shortcomings, the latest taking place in mid-2020. The interim report of this review concluded that the laws created to protect unique species and habitats are ineffective.

Brazil 
The Brazilian government created the Ministry of Environment in 1992 in order to develop better strategies for protecting the environment, using natural resources sustainably, and enforcing public environmental policies.  The Ministry of Environment has authority over policies involving environment, water resources, preservation, and environmental programs involving the Amazon.

Canada 
The Department of the Environment Act establishes the Department of the Environment in the Canadian government as well as the position Minister of the Environment.  Their duties include "the preservation and enhancement of the quality of the natural environment, including water, air and soil quality; renewable resources, including migratory birds and other non-domestic flora and fauna; water; meteorology;"  The Environmental Protection Act is the main piece of Canadian environmental legislation that was put into place March 31, 2000. The Act focuses on "respecting pollution prevention and the protection of the environment and human health in order to contribute to sustainable development." Other principle federal statutes include the Canadian Environmental Assessment Act, and the Species at Risk Act. When provincial and federal legislation are in conflict federal legislation takes precedence, that being said individual provinces can have their own legislation such as Ontario's Environmental Bill of Rights, and Clean Water Act.

China 

According to the U.S. Environmental Protection Agency, "China has been working with great determination in recent years to develop, implement, and enforce a solid environmental law framework. Chinese officials face critical challenges in effectively implementing the laws, clarifying the roles of their national and provincial governments, and strengthening the operation of their legal system." Explosive economic and industrial growth in China has led to significant environmental degradation, and China is currently in the process of developing more stringent legal controls. The harmonization of Chinese society and the natural environment is billed as a rising policy priority.

Congo (RC) 
In the Republic of Congo, inspired by the African models of the 1990s, the phenomenon of constitutionalization of environmental law appeared in 1992, which completed an historical development of environmental law and policy dating back to the years of independence and even long before the colonization. It gives a constitutional basis to environmental protection, which traditionally was part of the legal framework. The two Constitutions of 15 March 1992 and 20 January 2002 concretize this paradigm, by stating a legal obligation of a clean environment, by establishing a principle of compensation and a foundation of criminal nature. By this phenomenon, Congolese environmental law is situated between non-regression and the search for efficiency."

Ecuador 
With the enactment of the 2008 Constitution, Ecuador became the first country in the world to codify the Rights of Nature. The Constitution, specifically Articles 10 and 71–74, recognizes the inalienable rights of ecosystems to exist and flourish, gives people the authority to petition on the behalf of ecosystems, and requires the government to remedy violations of these rights. The rights approach is a break away from traditional environmental regulatory systems, which regard nature as property and legalize and manage degradation of the environment rather than prevent it.

The Rights of Nature articles in Ecuador's constitution are part of a reaction to a combination of political, economic, and social phenomena. Ecuador's abusive past with the oil industry, most famously the class-action litigation against Chevron, and the failure of an extraction-based economy and neoliberal reforms to bring economic prosperity to the region has resulted in the election of a New Leftist regime, led by President Rafael Correa, and sparked a demand for new approaches to development. In conjunction with this need, the principle of "Buen Vivir," or good living – focused on social, environmental and spiritual wealth versus material wealth – gained popularity among citizens and was incorporated into the new constitution.

The influence of indigenous groups, from whom the concept of "Buen Vivir" originates, in the forming of the constitutional ideals also facilitated the incorporation of the Rights of Nature as a basic tenet of their culture and conceptualization of "Buen Vivir."

Egypt 
The Environmental Protection Law outlines the responsibilities of the Egyptian government to "preparation of draft legislation and decrees pertinent to environmental management, collection of data both nationally and internationally on the state of the environment, preparation of periodical reports and studies on the state of the environment, formulation of the national plan and its projects, preparation of environmental profiles for new and urban areas, and setting of standards to be used in planning for their development, and preparation of an annual report on the state of the environment to be prepared to the President."

India 

In India, Environmental law is governed by the Environment Protection Act, 1986. This act is enforced by the Central Pollution Control Board and the numerous State Pollution Control Boards. Apart from this, there are also individual legislations specifically enacted for the protection of Water, Air, Wildlife, etc. Such legislations include :
The Water (Prevention and Control of Pollution) Act, 1974
The Water (Prevention and Control of Pollution) Cess Act, 1977
The Forest (Conservation) Act, 1980
The Air (Prevention and Control of Pollution) Act, 1981
Air (Prevention and Control of Pollution) (Union Territories) Rules, 1983
The Biological Diversity Act, 2002 and the Wild Life Protection Act, 1972
Batteries (Management and Handling) Rules, 2001
Recycled Plastics, Plastics Manufacture and Usage Rules, 1999
The National Green Tribunal established under the National Green Tribunal Act of 2010 has jurisdiction over all environmental cases dealing with a substantial environmental question and acts covered under the Water (Prevention and Control of Pollution) Act, 1974.
Water (Prevention and Control of Pollution) Cess Rules, 1978
Ganga Action Plan, 1986
The Forest (Conservation) Act, 1980
Wildlife protection Act, 1972
The Public Liability Insurance Act, 1991 and the Biological Diversity Act, 2002. The acts covered under Indian Wild Life Protection Act 1972 do not fall within the jurisdiction of the National Green Tribunal. Appeals can be filed in the Hon'ble Supreme Court of India.
Basel Convention on Control of TransboundaryMovements on Hazardous Wastes and Their Disposal, 1989 and Its Protocols
Hazardous Wastes (Management and Handling) Amendment Rules, 2003

Japan 
The Basic Environmental Law is the basic structure of Japan's environmental policies replacing the Basic Law for Environmental Pollution Control and the Nature Conservation Law. The updated law aims to address "global environmental problems, urban pollution by everyday life, loss of accessible natural environment in urban areas and degrading environmental protection capacity in forests and farmlands."

The three basic environmental principles that the Basic Environmental Law follows are "the blessings of the environment should be enjoyed by the present generation and succeeded to the future generations, a sustainable society should be created where environmental loads by human activities are minimized, and Japan should contribute actively to global environmental conservation through international cooperation."
From these principles, the Japanese government have established policies such as "environmental consideration in policy formulation, establishment of the Basic Environment Plan which describes the directions of long-term environmental policy, environmental impact assessment for development projects, economic measures to encourage activities for reducing environmental load, improvement of social infrastructure such as sewerage system, transport facilities etc., promotion of environmental activities by corporations, citizens and NGOs, environmental education, and provision of information, promotion of science and technology."

New Zealand 

The Ministry for the Environment and Office of the Parliamentary Commissioner for the Environment were established by the Environment Act 1986. These positions are responsible for advising the Minister on all areas of environmental legislation.  A common theme of New Zealand's environmental legislation is sustainably managing natural and physical resources, fisheries, and forests.  The Resource Management Act 1991 is the main piece of environmental legislation that outlines the government's strategy to managing the "environment, including air, water soil, biodiversity, the coastal environment, noise, subdivision, and land use planning in general."

Russia 
The Ministry of Natural Resources and Environment of the Russian Federation makes regulation regarding "conservation of natural resources, including the subsoil, water bodies, forests located in designated conservation areas, fauna and their habitat, in the field of hunting, hydrometeorology and related areas, environmental monitoring and pollution control, including radiation monitoring and control, and functions of public environmental policy making and implementation and statutory regulation."

Singapore
Singapore is a signatory of the Convention on Biological Diversity; with most of its CBD obligations being overseen by the National Biodiversity Reference Centre, a division of its National Parks Board (NParks). Singapore is also a signatory of the Convention on International Trade in Endangered Animals, with its obligations under that treaty also being overseen by NParks. The Parliament of Singapore has enacted numerous pieces of legislation to fulfil its obligations under these treaties, such as the Parks and Trees Act, Endangered Species (Import and Export) Act, and Wildlife Act. The new Wildlife (Protected Wildlife Species) Rules 2020 marks the first instance in Singapore's history that direct legal protection has been offered for specific named species, as listed in Parts 1-5 of the Rules' schedule.

South Africa

United Kingdom

United States

Vietnam 
Vietnam is currently working with the U.S. Environmental Protection Agency on dioxin remediation and technical assistance in order to lower methane emissions. In March 2002, the U.S and Vietnam signed the U.S.-Vietnam Memorandum of Understanding on Research on Human Health and the Environmental Effects of Agent Orange/Dioxin.

See also 
UK enterprise law
Environmental health
Environmental racism
Environmental racism in Europe
Indigenous rights
International law
List of environmental law journals
List of international environmental agreements

Notes

References
Akhatov, Aydar (1996). Ecology & International Law. Moscow: АST-PRESS. 512 pp.  
 Bimal N. Patel, ed. (2015). MCQ on Environmental Law. 
 Farber & Carlson, eds. (2013). Cases and Materials on Environmental Law, 9th. West Academic Publishing. 1008 pp. .
 Faure, Michael, and Niels Philipsen, eds. (2014). Environmental Law & European Law. The Hague: Eleven International Publishing. 142 pp.  
 Malik, Surender & Sudeep Malik, eds. (2015). Supreme Court on Environment Law. 
 Martin, Paul & Amanda Kennedy, eds. (2015). Implementing Environmental Law. Edward Elgar Publishing
 Damilola S. Olawuyi, Environmental Law in Arab States (Oxford University Press, 2022)

Further reading
Around the world, environmental laws are under attack in all sorts of ways (30 May 2017), The Conversation

External links
International
 United Nations Environment Programme
 ECOLEX (Gateway to Environmental Law)
 Environmental Law Alliance Worldwide (E-LAW)
 Centre for International Environmental Law
 Wildlife Interest Group, American Society of International Law
 EarthRights International
 Interamerican Association for Environmental Defense
 United Kingdom Environmental Law Association
 Lexadin global law database
 Upholding Environmental Laws in Asia and the Pacific

United States
American Bar Association Section of Environment, Energy and Resources
U.S. Environmental Protection Agency
Environmental Law Institute (ELI)
EarthJustice
"Law Journals: Submission and Ranking, 2007-2014," Washington and Lee University, Lexington, Virginia

Canada
West Coast Environmental Law (non-profit law firm)
Ecojustice
Canadian Environmental Law Association
Environmental Law Centre (of Alberta)

European Union
 Europa: Environmental rules of the European Union
 Europa: Summaries of Legislation - Environment

 
Environmental law schools
Environmental social science
Environmental protection